Nicolás Suárez Vaca (born December 23, 1978 in Santa Ana del Yacuma) is a Bolivian football defender and manager.

National team
Suárez made his debut for the Bolivia national team on November 3, 1999 in a friendly match against Paraguay, as a substitute for Gonzalo Galindo.

Coaching career
In April 2019, Suárez returned to Club Real Potosí to manage the club's reserve team. On 9 August 2019, Suárez was appointed manager of his former club Club Real Potosí. Due to bad results, he was fired on 8 October 2019.

References

External links

1978 births
Living people
People from Yacuma Province
Bolivian footballers
Bolivian football managers
Bolivia international footballers
Guabirá players
Club Blooming players
Club Real Potosí players
Oriente Petrolero players
Club San José players
C.D. Jorge Wilstermann players
Bolivian Primera División players
Association football defenders
Club Real Potosí managers